Horst Mann (8 July 1927 – 15 October 2018) was a German sprinter. He competed in the men's 400 metres at the 1956 Summer Olympics.

References

1927 births
2018 deaths
People from Szczecinek
People from the Province of Pomerania
Athletes (track and field) at the 1956 Summer Olympics
German male sprinters
Olympic athletes of the United Team of Germany
Place of birth missing